The 2016 American Athletic Conference softball tournament was held at the Collins Family Softball Complex on the campus of the University of Tulsa in Tulsa, Oklahoma from May 12 through May 14, 2016. The event determined the champion of the American Athletic Conference for the 2016 NCAA Division I softball season.  Third-seeded  won the Tournament for the first time and earned the American Athletic Conference's automatic bid to the 2015 NCAA Division I softball tournament.  All games were televised; the quarterfinals and semifinals were shown on the American Digital Network while the championship was broadcast on ESPN.

Previous winners of the Tournament were UCF in 2015 and former member Louisville in 2014.

Format and seeding
The conference's seven teams were seeded based on conference winning percentage from the round-robin regular season.  The teams then played a single-elimination tournament with the top seed earning a single bye.

Results

Bracket

Game results

All-Tournament Team
The following players were name to the All-Tournament Team.

Most Outstanding Player
Caitlin Sill was named Tournament Most Outstanding Player.  Sill was a pitcher for Tulsa who earned two wins in the tournament without allowing a run.

References

Tournament
American Athletic Conference softball tournament
AAC softball tournament